This is a list of 177 species in Lepidodexia, a genus of flesh flies in the family Sarcophagidae.

Lepidodexia species

L. affinis de Souza Lopez, 1983 c g
L. albida (Lopes, 1951) c g
L. albihirta (Dodge, 1965) c g
L. amazonica (Townsend, 1934) c g
L. andina (Townsend, 1912) c g
L. angusta (Aldrich, 1925) c g
L. angustifrons Lopes, 1993 c g
L. angustiventris (Curran & Walley, 1934) c g
L. antennata (Dodge, 1966) c g
L. apolinari Lopes, 1951 c g
L. aragua (Dodge, 1966) c g
L. asiliformis (Townsend, 1927) c g
L. atrata (Dodge, 1965) c g
L. aurea (Townsend, 1934) c g
L. azurea (Enderlein, 1928) c g
L. bicolor (Dodge, 1967) c
L. bisetosa (Dodge, 1968) c g
L. bivittata Curran, 1928 c g
L. blakeae Dodge, 1955 c g
L. bocainensis Lopes, 1980 c g
L. bogotana (Enderlein, 1928) c g
L. boraceana Lopes & Tibana, 1984 c g
L. borealis Reinhard, 1937 c g
L. brevigaster (Lopes, 1945) c
L. brevirostris (Lopes, 1946) c g
L. bufonivora (Lopes & Vogelsang, 1953) c g
L. calliphorina (Enderlein, 1928) c g
L. camorim (Lopes, 1991) c g
L. camorin Lopes, 1991 c g
L. camura (Hall, 1938) c g
L. carchiana Lopes, 1992 c g
L. carthaginiensis Lopes & Tibana, 1988 c g
L. carvalhoi Lopes, 1984 c g
L. catamarca Lopes, 1991 c g
L. chaetosa (Townsend, 1931) c g
L. chapadensis Tibana & Lopes, 1985 c g
L. chocoensis Lopes, 1992 c g
L. cingulata Lopes, 1961 c g
L. cochliomyia (Townsend, 1919) c g
L. cognata (Walker, 1853) c
L. comata (Aldrich, 1925) c g
L. confusa (Lopes, 1946) c
L. costalis (Townsend, 1927) c g
L. costaricensis Lopes & Tibana, 1988 c g
L. cubana (Lopes, 1951) c
L. cuenquensis Lopes, 1992 c g
L. currani Lopes, 1951 c g
L. cyaneiventris (Lopes, 1946) c
L. dimidiata (Wiedemann, 1830) c g
L. dissimilis (Dodge, 1965) c g
L. distincta (Lopes, 1947) c g
L. diversa (Lopes, 1946) c
L. diversinervis (Wulp, 1895) c g
L. diversipes (Coquillett, 1900) c g
L. dodgei Lopes, 1985 c g
L. dominicensis (Lopes, 1975) c
L. downesi (Dodge, 1965) c g
L. downsi Lopes, 1991 c g
L. ecuatoriana Lopes, 1984 c g
L. egregia (Hall, 1933) c g
L. elaborata (Hall, 1933) c g
L. elegans Coquillett, 1895 c g
L. facialis (Townsend, 1927) c g
L. fervens (Wiedemann, 1830) c g
L. fiebrigi (Enderlein, 1928) c g
L. flavipes de Souza Lopez, 1983 c g
L. flavopilosa (Lopes, 1951) c g
L. frontalis Aldrich, 1929 c g
L. fulviventris Lopes, 1980 c g
L. fumipennis (Lopes, 1946) c g
L. fuscianalis (Wulp, 1895) c g
L. gaucha Lopes, 1991 c g
L. gomesi Lopes, 1980 c g
L. grisea Lopes, 1951 c g
L. grisescens (Townsend, 1927) c g
L. guaillabamba Lopes, 1991 c g
L. guatemalteca Lopes, 1985 c g
L. guimaraesi Lopes, 1991 c g
L. hinei (Aldrich, 1930) c g
L. hirculus (Coquillett, 1910) c g
L. huixtlaensis de Souza Lopez, 1983 c g
L. hyalinipennis Lopes, 1992 c g
L. ignota (Lopes, 1947) c g
L. inconismus (Reinhard, 1957) c g
L. korytkowiskii Lopes, 1992 c g
L. latifrons Kano & Lopes, 1969 g
L. lenti Lopes, 1980 c g
L. lindneri (Townsend, 1931) c g
L. maculata Lopes, 1991 c g
L. major Lopes, 1993 c g
L. matogrossensis Lopes, 1991 c g
L. mendax Lopes, 1992 c g
L. mendesi Lopes, 1991 c g
L. metallica (Townsend, 1928) c g
L. mexicana Lopes, 1985 c g
L. miamensis (Townsend, 1918) c g
L. micropyga (Wulp, 1895) c g
L. minensis Lopes, 1980 c g
L. minuta Lopes, 1991 c g
L. modulata (Wulp, 1895) c g
L. monochaeta (Dodge, 1968) c g
L. myersi (Townsend, 1935) c g
L. napoensis de Souza Lopez, 1983 c g
L. nigribimbo (Dodge, 1965) c g
L. nigropilosa Lopes, 1951 c g
L. nocturnalis Walton, 1915 c g
L. obscura (Lopes, 1950) c g
L. occulta Lopes, 1986 c g
L. ochristriga (Enderlein, 1928) c g
L. ojedai Lopes, 1992 c g
L. oliveirai (Lopes, 1974) c g
L. olmaba Brimley, 1927 c g
L. opima (Wiedemann, 1830) c g
L. pacta (Townsend, 1934) c g
L. pallipes (Lopes & Tibana, 1988) c g
L. palpalis (Dodge, 1968) c g
L. panamensis (Dodge, 1968) c g
L. parva (Lopes, 1946) c
L. peculiaris Lopes, 1985 c g
L. peruana Lopes, 1986 c g
L. petersoni Lopes, 1984 c g
L. pilosa (Lopes, 1969) c g
L. plumigera (Wulp, 1895) c g
L. pomaschi Lopes, 1991 c g
L. proseni Lopes, 1991 c g
L. quadrisetosa Lopes, 1984 c g
L. reali Lopes & Tibana, 1988 c g
L. reducens (Enderlein, 1928) c g
L. reinhardi Lopes, 1979 c g
L. retusa (Hall, 1933) c g
L. robacki (Lopes, 1975) c g
L. rubriventris (Macquart, 1851) c g
L. rufianalis (Lopes, 1975) c g
L. rufipes (Dodge, 1965) c g
L. rufitibia (Wulp, 1895) c g
L. rufocaudatata (Bigot, 1889) c g
L. rustica (Lopes, 1950) c g
L. sapucaiensis Lopes, 1993 c g
L. sarcophagina (Townsend, 1927) c g
L. setifacies Lopes, 1984 c g
L. setifrons de Souza Lopez, 1983 c g
L. setosa (Coquillett, 1895) c g
L. sheldoni (Coquillett, 1898) c g
L. shewelli Lopes, 1984 c g
L. similis Lopes, 1984 c g
L. sinopi Lopes & Tibana, 1982 c g
L. souzalopesi Lehrer, 1995 c g
L. squamata (Walker, 1853) c g
L. strigosa (Reinhard, 1945) c g
L. subcylindrica (Townsend, 1935) c g
L. subpolita (Aldrich, 1916) c g
L. takaruni Lopes, 1991 c g
L. tandapiens Lopes, 1988 c g
L. teffeensis (Townsend, 1927) c g
L. tessellata (Aldrich, 1916) c g
L. tetraptera Brauer & von Bergenstamm, 1891 c g
L. teutonia Lopes, 1991 c g
L. townsendi (Aldrich, 1925) c g
L. trinidadensis Lopes, 1985 c g
L. tucumana (Blanchard, 1942) c g
L. tungurahuensis Lopes & Tibana, 1988 c g
L. tungurauensis Lopes & Tibana, 1988 c g
L. turrialba Lopes, 1991 c g
L. unicolor Aldrich, 1916 c g
L. uniseta (Lopes, 1950) c g
L. uruhuasi (Townsend, 1917) c g
L. veniseta (Dodge, 1968) c g
L. vexator (Dodge, 1968) c g
L. villipes (Dodge, 1965) c g
L. virgata (Wiedemann, 1830) c g
L. vittata (Lopes, 1968) c
L. weyrauchi Lopes, 1991 c g
L. woodi Lopes, 1985 c g
L. woodorum Pape, 1989 c g
L. wygodzinskyi Lopes, 1982 c g
L. zeledoni Lopes, 1985 c g
L. zygox (Hall, 1938) c g

This is a list of 177 species in Lepidodexia, a genus of flesh flies in the family Sarcophagidae.
Data sources: i = ITIS, c = Catalogue of Life, g = GBIF, b = Bugguide.net

References

Lepidodexia